A gear stick (rarely spelled gearstick), gear lever (both UK English), gearshift or shifter (both U.S. English), more formally known as a transmission lever, is a metal lever attached to the transmission of an automobile. The term gear stick mostly refers to the shift lever of a manual transmission, while in an automatic transmission, a similar lever is known as a gear selector. A gear stick will normally be used to change gear whilst depressing the clutch pedal with the left foot to disengage the engine from the drivetrain and wheels. Automatic transmission vehicles, including hydraulic (torque converter) automatic transmissions, automated manual and older semi-automatic transmissions (specifically clutchless manuals), like VW Autostick, and those with continuously variable transmissions, do not require a physical clutch pedal.

Alternative positions

Gear sticks are most commonly found between the front seats of the vehicle, either on the center console (sometimes even quite far up on the dashboard), the transmission tunnel (erroneously called a console shifter when the floor shifter mechanism is bolted to the transmission tunnel with the center console to cover up the shifter assembly when used with a rear or front-wheel drive vehicle), or directly on the floor. Some vehicles have a column shift where the lever is mounted on the steering column — in vehicles with a manual four-speed gearbox such as 1950s Mercedes-Benz cars and all two-stroke Trabants, this is actually a manual gear lever connected to the gearbox with a linkage. In automatic transmission cars, the lever functions more like a gear selector, and, in modern cars, does not necessarily need to have a shifting linkage due to its shift-by-wire principle. It has the added benefit of allowing for a full width bench-type front seat (though some models with bucket seating as an option include it).  It has since fallen out of favor, although it can still be found widely on North American-market pick-up trucks, vans, emergency vehicles (both law enforcement and EMS - the column shifter is retained where a floor shifter is unfeasible due to mounting the mobile data terminal and 2-way radio), and "full-size" US sedans such as the Ford Crown Victoria.   A dashboard mounted shift was common on certain French models such as the Citroën 2CV and Renault 4. Both the Bentley Mark VI and the Riley Pathfinder had their gear lever to the right of the right-hand drive driver's seat, alongside the driver's door, where it was not unknown for British cars to also have their handbrake. (Left-hand drive models received a column shift.)

In some modern sports cars, the gear lever has been replaced entirely by "paddles", which are a pair of levers, usually operating electrical switches (rather than a mechanical connection to the gearbox), mounted on either side of the steering column, where one increments the gears up, and the other down. Formula 1 cars  used to hide the gear stick behind the steering wheel within the nose bodywork before the modern practice of mounting the "paddles" on the (removable) steering wheel itself.

Gear knob and switches

A knob, variously called gear knob, shift knob, gear shift knob or stick shift knob, forms the handle for the gear stick. Typically the gear knob includes a diagram of the shift pattern of the gear selection system, i.e. the positions to which the gear stick should be moved when selecting a gear. In some older manual transmission vehicles, the knob may incorporate a switch to engage an overdrive; in some automatic transmission vehicles it may incorporate a switch to engage a special mode such as a sports mode or to disengage overdrive. Both of the above-mentioned switches may also be found on the console or on steering column stalks instead. Manual shifters on the steering column, if having only three forward speeds, are typically called a three on the tree, and having four forward speeds, are called four-on-the-floor. The lowest of these gears, if set at a much lower ratio than a typical 1st-gear ratio, is often called a granny gear.

Starting the car in gear with the clutch engaged causes it to lurch forwards or backward since the starter motor by itself produces sufficient torque to move the whole vehicle; this can be highly dangerous, especially if the parking brake is not firmly applied and can be injurious to the starter and drivetrain. Therefore, novice drivers are taught to rock the knob of a manual gearbox from side to side before starting the engine to confirm that the gearbox is in neutral. For the same reason, modern cars require the clutch pedal to be depressed before the starter will engage (though some modern vehicles have a button that disables the clutch start requirement if held down when starting, for rare situations when starting the car in gear is necessary). The latter practice is also useful in extremely cold conditions or with a weak battery, as it avoids the starter motor also having to turn over a gearbox full of cold and highly viscous oil.

Many automatic transmission vehicles have extra controls on the gear stick, or very close by, which modify the choices made by the transmission system depending on engine and road speed, e.g. "sports" or "economy" modes which will broadly speaking allow, respectively, for higher and lower revolutions per minute, before shifting up.

Some specialist vehicles have controls for other functions on the gear stick. The Land Rover Freelander introduced a button for that company's Hill Descent Control system feature, which uses the brakes to simulate the function of a low-ratio gearbox in steep descents.

Secondary gear levers
In some traditional four-wheel drive vehicles there can be a second gear lever which engages a low-ratio gearbox, used on tough terrain. Further, a similar-looking lever called a transfer case switches between two- and four-wheel drive, or engage differential locks; these are not "gear levers," however.

Shift pattern

The shift pattern refers to the layout of the gears. In a typical manual transmission car, first gear is located to the left, and forwards. In many trucks and some sports cars it is instead in a "dog leg" position, to the left and rearwards. There is usually a spring-loading to return the stick to the central position. Reverse gear is commonly positioned in the best choice of location to avoid accidental engagement.

Manual transmission

A typical manual transmission vehicle, with (for example) five forward gears, will thus have seven possible positions: the five forwards gears, reverse gear, and a central "neutral" position. Some vehicles have a special button to prevent accidental engagement of reverse. Others require that the lever be lifted (e.g. Nissan), pressed down (e.g. Volkswagen), or moved with extra force (e.g. BMW) to engage reverse. In transmissions with reverse directly below fifth, there may be a mechanical lock-out preventing selection of reverse other than from neutral, thus preventing a driver used to a six-speed transmission from engaging reverse while trying to select sixth. Some transmissions also have an electronically controlled error-prevention safeguard that blocks the first and sometimes the second gear from being selected if the vehicle is moving fast enough to exceed the engine's maximum RPM.

Automatic transmission
Automatic transmissions traditionally have had a straight pattern, adopting the classic P-R-N-D gate, with "P" being to the front, topmost position (or "P" all the way to the left on a column-mounted shifter); the corresponding shift positions being:

P = Park - transmission is mechanically locked in position for parking, via a parking pawl.
R = Reverse - reverse motion
N = Neutral - no drive applied to the wheels with the engine running
D = Drive - forward motion with fully-automatic operation in all gears.

All automatics use some sort of manual override of the transmission, with numbered positions in descending order marked below (or to the right) of "drive", which will prevent the transmission shifting to a gear higher than the selected, but maintaining automatic operation between all lesser numbered gears.  Such gates will appear as P-R-N-D-3-2-1 for example. On some vehicles (mainly Japanese makes such as Honda, Toyota and Lexus) these numbered positions are replaced by a single "L" (for "low") position, which will hold the transmission in whatever lower ratio is required for climbing steep grades or for heavy acceleration: P-R-N-D-L.

More modern automatic transmissions have employed a "J-gate" (pioneered by Jaguar) where some gears are on the left-hand "arm", some on the right, and there is a sideways movement at the rear of the pattern.  The second-generation Range Rover from 1995 used an "H-gate", with two parallel PRND gates on the opposing legs of the "H" for both high range and low range ratios, for normal and off-road driving, respectively.

Some modern gearboxes, namely manumatics, such as Alfa Romeo Sportronic, and Porsche Tiptronic, has a traditional automatic shift pattern to the right, with a special position to the left in which movement of the stick forwards and backward increments the gears up and down respectively. This can be useful in snow or dirt conditions, where it may be necessary to start from second gear.

Electronic gear shifts

  
With the advent of drive by wire (or more properly, shift by wire) computer-controlled transmissions (particularly in the case of automatics), the gear stick no longer needs to be mechanically connected to the transmission unit itself, and can, therefore, be made much smaller since there is no need to package either remote mechanisms or complex interlocking arrangements.  This has allowed designers to replace the gear stick completely with either button, rotary knobs (current Jaguar, Land Rover and Ford models are good examples of this), or a miniaturized gear stick on the center console. This can be seen in some Audis, BMWs and the Lincoln Continental. Japanese finger shift is another example. It is a revival of an approach used in the 1950s by the Chrysler push-button PowerFlite and the Packard Touchbutton Ultramatic.

Special knobs
A shift knob also known as a gear knob, gear shift knob and stick shift knob is the physical interface between the gear stick and the driver's hand. Made of many materials from simple plastics through to platinum, it comes in many shapes sizes and weights. OEM shift knobs are generally spherical in shape, often resembling a chess pawn when attached to the gear stick.

The shift knob's principal function is the ergonomical interface between driver and the manu. The gear stick, as the name implies, is often just a machined or cast aluminium or steel rod with or without threading the shift knob is fitted on its end.

In recent years, manufacturers have increased the variety of shifts knobs available to the consumer from inexpensive plastics to diamond-studded white gold.

Weighted shift knobs 

A weighted shift knob is a performance-driven aftermarket modification which entirely replaces the OEM shift knob and sits atop the aftermarket short shifter or OEM manual shift stick. Initially designed to be used in tandem with a short shifter, it is increasingly being purchased for stock stick shifts. The weight generally varies between 400 and 600 grams or more, depending on the material used. The principle of the weighted shift knob is to make the stick shifter top-heavy, thus increasing the throw momentum in order to decrease the time between shifts. Weighted gear knobs are offered for sale by a variety of North American-based manufacturers in many shapes and finishes, though they are significantly more expensive than the commonly available aftermarket shift knob.

References 

Automotive accessories
Automotive transmission technologies
Vehicle parts